The mixed doubles tournament at the 1980 French Open was held from 26 May to 8 June 1980 on the outdoor clay courts at the Stade Roland Garros in Paris, France. Billy Martin and Anne Smith won the title, defeating Stanislav Birner and Renáta Tomanová in the final.

Draw

Finals

Top half

Bottom half

External links
 Main draw
 1980 French Open – Doubles draws and results at the International Tennis Federation

Mixed Doubles
French Open by year – Mixed doubles